WHAZ may refer to:

 WHAZ (AM), a radio station (1330 AM) licensed to Troy, New York, United States
 WHAZ-FM, a radio station (97.5 FM) licensed to Hoosick Falls, New York, United States